Sir Albert McQuarrie (1 January 1918 – 13 January 2016) was a British Conservative politician who served as a Member of Parliament (MP) from 1979 to 1987.

Early life
Albert McQuarrie was born on 1 January 1918 in Greenock, Inverclyde. McQuarrie was the son of Algernon McQuarrie, a Greenock shipping businessman.

He was educated at Greenock High School and the Royal College of Science and Technology, Glasgow. He became a design consultant and served as a councillor on Greenock Town Council from 1949 to 1955.

Military service 
McQuarrie joined the British Army in 1939 at the outbreak of World War II, serving in the Royal Engineers.

Parliamentary career
McQuarrie unsuccessfully contested Kilmarnock in 1966, and Caithness and Sutherland in October 1974. He was Member of Parliament (MP) for East Aberdeenshire from 1979 to 1983, gaining the seat from the Scottish National Party's Douglas Henderson with a majority of only 558. He was then MP for Banff and Buchan from 1983 to 1987, when he lost his seat to future SNP leader Alex Salmond. In the House of Commons he was Chairman of the British Gibraltar All Party Group. He campaigned for the retention of British sovereignty over Gibraltar. McQuarrie was knighted in 1987. McQuarrie died in January 2016, aged 98. He was nicknamed the "Buchan Bulldog" during his time in Parliament.

Personal life 
McQuarrie married his first wife, Roseleen McCaffery, in 1945.

References

 Greenock Telegraph
The Times Guide to the House of Commons, Times Newspapers Ltd, 1966 & 1987

A Lifetime of Memories, December 2013, published by The Memoir Club

External links

1918 births
2016 deaths
Scottish Conservative Party MPs
Unionist Party (Scotland) councillors
UK MPs 1979–1983
UK MPs 1983–1987
Royal Engineers officers
People from Greenock
British Army personnel of World War II
Knights Bachelor